Statistics of the USFSA Football Championship in the 1912 season.

Tournament

First round
 CASG Orléans 4-1 Le Mans UC
 Union sportive Servannaise 5-0 Angers Université Club
 Sporting Club Dauphinois 1-3 FC Lyon
 US Tourcoing 5-0 Football club de Braux
 Société nautique de Bayonne 0-4 Stade Bordelais UC  
 Cercle des Sports Stade Lorrain 4-3 Racing Club de Reims

Huitièmes de finale  
Stade Raphaëlois 2-2 SH Marseille (match replayed)
Stade Raphaëlois 2-1 SH Marseille  
 Olympique de Cette 3-2 Stade toulousain
 SM Caen 1-2 AS Française
 FC Rouen 2-1 Amiens SC
 US Tourcoing 5-1 Cercle des Sports Stade Lorrain 
 Union sportive Servannaise 13-0 CASG Orléans
 Stade Bordelais UC 10-0 Sporting Club angérien
 FC Lyon 9-1 Racing Club Franc-Comtois de Besançon

Quarterfinals  
 AS Française 3-1 Union sportive Servannaise
 US Tourcoing 3-2 FC Rouen
 Olympique de Cette 3-2 Stade Bordelais UC
 Stade Raphaëlois 4-1 FC Lyon

Semifinals 
 Stade Raphaëlois 2-0 US Tourcoing
 AS Française 6-1 Olympique de Cette

Final 
Stade Raphaëlois 2-1 AS Française

References
RSSF

USFSA Football Championship
1
France